Nikolai Dmitrievich Chindyajkin is a Russian actor and theatre director. Honored Artist of the RSFSR (1985), People's Artist of Russia (2013).

Selected filmography
1995 Music for December
1998 Mama Don't Cry
2000 Empire under Attack (TV)
2000 Tender Age
2002 In Motion
2006 The Orange Sky
2007 The Sovereign's Servant
2012 And Here's What's Happening to Me
2013-present The Sniffer (TV)

References

External links 
 

1947 births
Living people
Russian male film actors
Russian male stage actors
Soviet male film actors
Soviet  male stage actors
Honored Artists of the RSFSR
People's Artists of Russia
Russian Academy of Theatre Arts alumni